Prasonicella is a genus of East African orb-weaver spiders first described by M. Grasshoff in 1971.  it contains only two species.

References

Araneidae
Araneomorphae genera
Spiders of Africa